Afipia broomeae is a species of the Afipia bacterial genus. It is a gram-negative, oxidase-positive, non-fermentative rod in the alpha-2 subgroup of the class Proteobacteria. It is motile by means of a single flagellum.

References

Further reading

External links
LPSN

Type strain of Afipia broomeae at BacDive -  the Bacterial Diversity Metadatabase

Nitrobacteraceae
Bacteria described in 1991